Shafiq-ur-Rahman is a Bangladesh Nationalist Party politician and the former Director General of Bangladesh Coast Guard.

Career
Shafiq-ur-Rahman was the Director General of Bangladesh Coast Guard from February 1995 to August 1998. In 1998 Bangladesh Anti Corruption Commission filed cases against him at the Cantonment Police Station for embezzling 70 million taka. He retired as a Naval Commodore. He is a director of Ashiyan Group and executive director of Sentry Security Services Limited. He was arrested in September 2016 on the charges filed by Anti Corruption Commission. He is a member of the national executive committee of Bangladesh Nationalist Party.

References

Bangladesh Nationalist Party politicians
Bangladesh Navy personnel
Director Generals of Bangladesh Coast Guard
Living people
Year of birth missing (living people)